The Gemäldegalerie Alte Meister (Old Masters Gallery) in Dresden, Germany, displays around 750 paintings from the 15th to the 18th centuries. It includes major Italian Renaissance works as well as Dutch and Flemish paintings. Outstanding works by German, French, and Spanish painters of the period are also among the gallery's attractions.

The Old Masters are part of the Dresden State Art Collections. The collection is located in the Semper Gallery, the gallery wing of the Zwinger.

History 

When the Kunstkammer (Art Chamber) of the Electors of Saxony in Dresden was founded by Augustus, Elector of Saxony in 1560, paintings were subordinate to collectors' pieces from science, other art works and curiosities. It was not until the beginning of the 18th century that Augustus II the Strong and his son Frederick Augustus II started to collect paintings systematically. Over a period of less than 60 years, these two art-loving Electors of Saxony, who were also Kings of Poland, expanded the collections significantly. In 1745, the 100 best pieces of the collection belonging to the Duke of Modena (Francesco III) were purchased, arriving in Dresden the following year.

As the fast-growing painting collection soon required more space for storage and presentation, it was moved from Dresden Castle to the adjacent Stallgebäude (the Electors' Stables Building) in 1747.

In the meantime the collection had achieved European fame. Paintings from all over Europe, especially from Italy, Paris, Amsterdam and Prague, were acquired and sent to Dresden. The purchasing activities of the Electors were crowned by the acquisition of Raphael's Sistine Madonna in 1754. The Dresden painting gallery became not only one of the most famous Old Masters collections in Northern European, but also a prototype of the modern museums that would emerge in the late 18th century.

In 1838, the architect Gottfried Semper was invited by a gallery commission working for King Frederick Augustus II, to design an appropriate architectural setting for the collection. The new gallery wing of the Zwinger was consequently built from 1847 to 1854. On 25 September 1855, the Neues Königliches Museum (New Royal Museum) opened in the Semper Gallery where it is still located today.

Due to shortage of space in 1931, the Modern Department of the museum with paintings from the 19th and 20th centuries moved into a separate building on Brühl's Terrace, laying the foundations for what is now known as the New Masters Gallery.

When World War II was imminent in 1938, the museum was closed. The artworks were mostly safely stored away when the gallery building itself was severely damaged in the bombing of Dresden on 13 February 1945. At the end of the war in 1945, most of the paintings were confiscated by the Red Army and transported to Moscow and Kiev. On their return to Dresden in 1955, part of the collection was displayed on the ground floor of the still partly destroyed Semper Gallery. The Old Masters Gallery re-opened in 1960 after the reconstruction of the gallery building was completed. While the most important paintings survived this period, the losses were significant. Records from 1963 state that 206 paintings had been destroyed and 507 were missing. Of these, some 450 are still missing today.

Collection 

Some 750 paintings, or 40 percent of the entire collection, are exhibited in the gallery. They date from the 15th to the 18th centuries.  Paintings from the 19th century onwards are displayed in the New Masters Gallery (Gemäldegalerie Neue Meister) in the Albertinum.

Renaissance and Baroque masterpieces by Italian painters such as Raphael, Titian, Giorgione, Correggio, Tintoretto and Guercino are displayed. The collection contains a large number of 17th-century Flemish and Dutch paintings by Rubens, Rembrandt, Jordaens, Van Dyck and Vermeer. Outstanding works by German, French and Spanish painters are also among the gallery's attractions.

With 58 paintings by Lucas Cranach the Elder and Lucas Cranach the Younger, the gallery houses the world's largest collection of Cranach paintings. Panels and canvases of the early Renaissance are also exhibited, including the recently restored Saint Sebastian by Antonello da Messina.

The color of the walls is used to structure the collection. Italian artwork is exhibited in rooms with deep red walls. Dutch and Flemish paintings are shown on green backgrounds. Spanish and French pictures from the 17th century are displayed on gray walls.

The Gemäldegalerie Alte Meister receives more than 500,000 visitors a year.

Highlights 
{{gallery
|height=150 
|mode=packed 
|File:Giorgione - Sleeping Venus - Google Art Project 2.jpg|Giorgione: Sleeping Venus, 1508/10
|File:Jan Vermeer van Delft 002.jpg|Johannes Vermeer: The Procuress, 1656
|File:Jan van Eyck 085.jpg|Jan van Eyck: Dresden Triptych, c. 1437
|File:Hans Holbein the Younger - Charles de Solier, Sieur de Morette - Google Art Project.jpg|Hans Holbein the Younger: Charles de Solier, comte de Morette, (1480/81–1564), 1534/35
|File:Francisco de Zurbarán - The Prayer of St. Bonaventura about the Selection of the New Pope - Google Art Project.jpg|Francisco de Zurbarán: Saint Bonaventure at Prayer, 1628/29
|File:Matti Preti, Liberazione di San Pietro, Dresda, Gemäldegalerie Alte Meister.jpg|Mattia Preti: The Deliverance of Saint Peter from Prison, 1650
|File:Bernardo Bellotto, il Canaletto - Dresden from the Right Bank of the Elbe, above the Augustusbrücke - WGA01830.jpg|Bernardo Bellotto (Canaletto): Dresden From the Right Bank of the Elbe Above the Augustus Bridge, 1747
|File:Canaletto - Dresden seen from the Right Bank of the Elbe, beneath the Augusts Bridge - Google Art Project.jpg|Bernardo Bellotto (Canaletto): Dresden From the Right Bank of the Elbe Below the Augustus Bridge, 1748
|File:Peter Paul Rubens - Drunk Hercules supported by a couple of Satyrs.jpg|Peter Paul Rubens: Hercules Drunk, Being Led Away By a Nymph and a Satyr, c. 1613/14
|File:Diogenes Jordaens.jpg|Jacob Jordaens: Diogenes Searching for an Honest Man, c. 1642
}}

 Other 
 The year 2012 marked the 500th anniversary of Raphael's Dresden masterpiece Sistine Madonna'' which was celebrated with a special exhibition.
 The paintings were moved from the western part of the building into the renovated eastern part in January 2016. The visible collection was reduced to approximately 400 pieces for this period. The renovation of the western part was finished in 2017.

See also
 List of museums in Saxony

Notes and references

Further reading
 Virginie Spenlé: Die Dresdner Gemäldegalerie und Frankreich. Der "bon goût" in Sachsen, Beucha: Sax-Verlag 2008

External links 

 Old Masters Picture Gallery of the Dresden State Art Collections
 Gemäldegalerie Alte Meister within Google Arts & Culture

Staatliche Kunstsammlungen Dresden
Art museums established in 1855
1855 establishments in Saxony